The Nebraska City News-Press is the oldest newspaper in Nebraska.  It was first published in 1854 and edited by Julius Sterling Morton - founder of Arbor Day and President Grover Cleveland's Secretary of Agriculture.  The paper is published twice a week on Tuesdays and Fridays in Nebraska City, Nebraska, the county seat of Otoe County.

References

See also
 List of newspapers in Nebraska
 List of newspapers owned by GateHouse Media

Newspapers published in Nebraska
1854 establishments in Nebraska Territory
Newspapers established in 1854